Microwave and Optical Technology Letters is a monthly peer-reviewed scientific journal published by Wiley-Blackwell. The editor-in-chief is Kai Chang (Texas A&M University). The journal covers technology that operates in wavelengths ranging from radio frequency to the optical spectrum.

Abstracting and indexing 
This journal is abstracted and indexed in:

According to the Journal Citation Reports, the journal has a 2020 impact factor of 1.392.

References

External links 

Publications established in 1988
English-language journals
Optics journals
Monthly journals
Wiley (publisher) academic journals
Electrical and electronic engineering journals